The Cvașnița is a left tributary of the Ruscova in Maramureș County, Romania. It flows into the Ruscova in Poienile de sub Munte.

References

Rivers of Romania
Rivers of Maramureș County